Lee Sun Chau (周理信, i.e., 周六姑,  1890-1979) was one of the first female Chinese doctors of Western Medicine in China.

Education and Medical Work
Lee Sun Chau was an alumna of Belilios Public School (庇理羅士女子中學). In the late 1910s she graduated from Hackett Medical College for Women (夏葛女子醫學院), and she then worked as a staff physician at the David Gregg Hospital for Women and Children (also known as Yuji Hospital 柔濟醫院, currently 广州医学院第三附属医院) 
located on Duo Bao Road (多寶路), 广州市荔湾区 Guangzhou, China.

The photo at the right was taken in Guangzhou, China, in the 1910s. It shows Lee Sun Chau (seated) and her classmate Yuen Hing WONG (黃婉卿) (standing). They both attended the Hackett Medical College for Women in Guangzhou, China. Both graduated from the College and practiced Western Medicine in China.

Due to the Warlord Era in China, Lee Sun Chau moved from Guangzhou to Hong Kong in late 1920.  There she worked in Hong Kong Sanatorium & Hospital as an anesthesiologist under Dr. Li Shu Fan (1887-1966) and later as the Matron of the Hospital.

Marriage and Family
Lee Sun Chau married Po Yin Chan (陳步賢) (1883-1965) in Hong Kong on Jan. 7, 1911. The wedding was officiated by Vicar Tsing-Shan Fok (霍靜山) (1851-1918) and was held in St. Stephen’s Church.  Po-Yin Chan was an engineer and a revolutionary under Sun Yat-sen (孫中山) in the Chinese Revolution of 1911, and was a Senator of Guangzhou in the 1920s.

Grandfathers
Lee Sun Chau was a granddaughter (father's side) of Rev. Hok Shu Chau 周學舒 [or 周學, or 周勵堂] (spelled Zhou Xue in Mandarin) (1826-1918), the first ordained Chinese minister of the Methodist Church 循道會 (衛斯理會) in Southern China Rev. Chau pastored the Methodist Church in Guangzhou, China, in 1877-1916. Prior to being ordained, he conducted evangelical work in the clinic of Dr. Benjamin Dobson. In 1852, Rev. Chau was baptized by Rev. Liang Fa 梁發 (1789-1855), the very first Chinese pastor in the world.  Rev. Liang Fa was ordained by Dr. Robert Morrison (1782-1834), a missionary of the London Missionary Society who translated the whole Bible to Chinese.  Lee Sun Chau was also a granddaughter (mother's side) of Rev. Wei Tsing Wan (尹維清), who was ordained by the London Missionary Society in China.

Uncle
Lee Sun Chau was a niece of Man-Kai Wan (尹文階)(1869-1927), who was a younger brother of her mother, a son of Rev. Wei Tsing Wan (尹維清) and a son-in-law of To Tsai Church (道濟會堂) Elder Au Fung-Chi (區鳳墀)(1847-1914). Au was the Chinese language teacher of Sun Yat-sen (孫中山). Man-Kai Wan was one of the first Chinese doctors of Western Medicine in Hong Kong. 
 In 1920-1922, he served as the inaugural Chairman of the Hong Kong Chinese Medical Association 香港中華醫學會 (currently Hong Kong Medical Association 香港醫學會). In 1922, he served as the Chairman of the Chinese YMCA of Hong Kong (香港中華基督教青年會). He was one of the founders of the Hong Kong Sanatorium & Hospital. He was also a secondary school classmate of Sun Yat-sen in The Government Central College (中央書院, currently Queen's College, Hong Kong, 皇仁書院) in Hong Kong. Wan and Sun graduated from secondary school together in 1886. In 1893, they started a medical clinic (東西藥局) together.  Wan also protected Sun during Sun's long and dangerous preparation for the 1911 Chinese Revolution. Man-Kai Wan was also the Chairman of the Board of a Christian newspaper called “Great Light Newspaper” (大光報) that was distributed in Hong Kong and China. In 1912, Sun wrote for the newspaper four words “與國同春”, meaning springtime along with the Nation.

Brother-in-law
Lee Sun Chau's brother-in-law (husband of her sister 周瑞莲, 1881-19xx, who was the eldest child of her parents) Hongkui Wong 黄康衢 (1876-1961) moved to Singapore to practice medicine after graduation from the Hong Kong Western Medical College 香港西醫書院 (same college attended by Sun Yat-Sen) in 1900.  Wong  was a member of the Chinese Revolutionary Alliance 中國同盟會 (Nanyang Branch). In 1900, Sun's Japanese friend Tōten Miyazaki 宮崎寅藏 (1871-1922, a Japanese person who supported the 1911 Chinese Revolution) came to Singapore to visit Kang Youwei 康有為 (1858-1927, the leader of the Reform Movement 維新變法派 in the late Qing Dynasty), who was living at the time in the home of Shuyuan Qiu 邱菽园 (1873-1941, rich overseas Chinese businessman).  Unexpectedly, Kang suspected that Tōten Miyazaki wanted to assassinate himself, so he reported to the British colonial government.  Thus, Tōten Miyazaki was arrested. Sun then came to Singapore from Saigon to rescue him, but he was also detained. Wong and several other comrades in Singapore explained to the authorities that Miyazaki Tōten had no intention of assassinating Kang. As a result, Tōten Miyazaki was deported and permanently banned from entering Singapore, while Sun was banned from entering Singapore for five years.

Brother
Lee Sun Chau's younger brother is Wai Cheung Chau 周懷璋 (1893-1965), who was the 8th child, while Lee Sun Chau was the 6th child.  Wai Cheung Chau graduated from the medical school of the University of Hong Kong in 1916 and subsequently practiced medicine in Hong Kong for over four decades.  He was the superintendent of the Hong Kong Sanatorium & Hospital. During the Battle of Hong Kong in December 1941, he was present in the battle at Magazine Gap Road as a medical officer of St John Ambulance. On Magazine Gap Road, while he was in a car, the person sitting next to him was killed and he was wounded by a bullet through his lung.  The blood clot in his lung was with him for the rest of his life.  His medical work included the 1936 medical treatment of General Chen Jitang 陳濟棠 (1890-1954) from Guangzhou. As a well-respected physician, he was elected as the president of the Hong Kong Medical Association in 1939. In 1919, he participated in founding successful schools for work-study people and women in Hong Kong. He died in 1965 at the age of 72. His funeral was officiated by Ronald Hall (何明華, 1895-1975), Anglican Church (Hong Kong Sheng Kung Hui) Bishop of Hong Kong.

Daughter
Lee Sun Chau's second child, daughter Rebecca Chan Chung (鍾陳可慰) (1920-2011), was a United States World War II veteran (Nurse) with the Flying Tigers and then the United States Army in Kunming, China, where she worked under Lieutenant Colonel Dr. Fred Manget. In addition, as a Nurse with the China National Aviation Corporation (CNAC) (中國航空公司) during World War II, she flew over The Hump (駝峰) across the Himalayas between India and China for about 50 times. For her service during World War II, she was awarded U.S. World War II medals and the U.S. Congressional Gold Medal. After World War II, she became a Nursing educator and a leader of Nursing in Hong Kong. Rebecca Chan Chung's autobiography, Piloted to Serve (飛虎戰, 駝峰險, 亂世情), provides details on Lee Sun Chau.

Granddaughter
Lee Sun Chau's granddaughter (the second child of Rebecca Chan Chung) Deborah Chung (鍾端玲) dedicated her book Carbon Fiber Composites (1994) to the memory of Lee Sun Chau. Deborah Chung is an American scientist and professor, who is best known for her invention of smart concrete. She is ranked 1st worldwide in the research field of Building and Construction, according to a 2021 Stanford University citation-based study.

References

1890 births
1979 deaths
Chinese women physicians
20th-century Chinese physicians
20th-century women physicians